The head of the Ghana Army was formerly referred to as the army commander but now has the title above. The current Chief of Army Staff is Major General Thomas Oppong Peprah. He was appointed to the position by President Akuffo-Addo on 7 February 2020.

List of Chiefs of Army Staff

References

Ghana
Chiefs of Army Staff (Ghana)
Ghanaian Heads of Security Services